Renewable energy in Armenia ranges from geothermal, hydroelectric, solar and wind energy in Armenia.

Development of renewable energy 
The European Union has supported Armenia's transition to sustainable energy through various initiatives and grants. In 2019, the Head of the EU Delegation to Armenia, Andrea Wiktorin stated: "Armenia is moving forward on its sustainable energy pathway, with strong support from the European Union."

According to the International Energy Agency, imports of oil and gas continue to cover 75% of Armenia’s energy needs. However, the Government of Armenia has focused it's energy policy towards developing indigenous energy sources, mainly renewable, and on replacing the country’s main nuclear reactor.

Meanwhile, energy efficiency policy has also become a bigger priority as energy security and reliability remain key focus areas of the government. Armenia is part of the EU4Energy Progamme, which provides the six countries of the Eastern Partnership with the necessary tools for effective evidence-based policy design and shaping policy in such sectors as energy security, sustainable energy and energy markets.

See also

 Energy in Armenia
 Electricity sector in Armenia
 Solar power in Armenia
 Renewable energy
 Renewable energy by country 
 Renewable energy in Asia
 Renewable energy in Europe

References